The 30th Street Station District, also referred to as the 30th Street District, is a proposed urban development located in West Philadelphia in Philadelphia, Pennsylvania, United States. The area will be home to eight modern skyscrapers or highrises ranging in heights between 1,200 ft and 405 ft with four other buildings (under 400 feet). The property, if approved and built will be owned by Amtrak and will be a major addition to the City of Philadelphia. The project is expected to cost between seven and eleven billion dollars.

The project would be a huge addition to the city. Many believe that the project will provide a second downtown with some of the largest buildings not in Center City.

Aside from adding new buildings to the skyline, architects have put in their plans to connect West Philadelphia to Center City by adding new walking paths, a walking bridge, and more connections to make traveling by car or bus from the 30th Street Station to downtown Philadelphia easier and faster. In addition, the placement of the current phase of construction would allow expansion north towards the Philadelphia Museum of Art and the Philadelphia Zoo.

Project history
The 30th Street Station District Plan is a long-range, joint master planning effort led by Amtrak, Brandywine Realty Trust, Drexel University, the Pennsylvania Department of Transportation, and the Southeastern Pennsylvania Transportation Authority to develop a comprehensive vision for the future of the 30th Street Station District in the year 2050 and beyond.

A $2 billion investment in roads, utilities, parks, bridges, and extension of transit services will unlock $4.5 billion in private real estate investment, in addition to an estimated $3.5 billion for Drexel’s Schuylkill Yards project. These investments in the District will have robust and widespread economic development benefits, with the potential to generate $3.8 billion in City and State taxes and 40,000 jobs when complete.

Plan
The District Plan lays out a vision for the next 35 years and beyond to:
 Accommodate a projected 20 to 25 million passenger trips per year – double the current capacity – circulating through an enhanced 30th Street Station;

 Build 18 million square feet of new development;
 House between 8,000 and 10,000 new residents
 Support up to 40,000 jobs; and
 Create 40 acres of new open space or green space for the city, including a new civic space at the station’s front door.

Reconnecting the station
Passenger volume at 30th Street Station is projected to more than double over the next 25 years and beyond. Travel to the District is easily achieved by a number of modes, with nearly 100,000 trips made daily by train, subway, bus, trolley, car, bicycle, or on foot. However, the modes do not clearly connect, creating a confusing and sometimes precarious experience for visitors.

For almost 30 years, passengers transferring between 30th Street Station and the trolley and subway lines below Market Street have lacked a covered, climate-controlled route, forced instead to leave the station and cross a busy 30th Street. The Plan proposes to re-establish a convenient and safe connection between these stations, via a new stairway within 30th Street Station’s Main Hall and through an active and day-lit below-grade retail concourse.

The Plan also envisions a permanent home for intercity buses (BoltBus, Megabus, and others) on the north side of Arch Street as part of an integrated, multimodal transportation facility. The new intercity bus terminal connects directly via pedestrian bridge to 30th Street Station and provides an indoor waiting area along with bus queuing. In the long-term, an additional Amtrak concourse could anchor this new transit center.

Funding and Cost
Amtrak and its partners in the proposed redevelopment of a massive swath around 30th Street Station in University City say the decades-long plan, including partially capping the adjacent rail yard, will involve $6.5 billion in infrastructure funding and private investment. 
The financial projection is part of the planning team's final blueprint for the 175-acre site extending northeast from 30th Street Station.

Publication of the 30th Street Station District Plan ends a two-year, $5.25 million study led by Amtrak, Drexel University, Brandywine Realty Trust, SEPTA, and PennDot for the area between Walnut and Spring Garden Streets east of Drexel's campus and Powelton Village.

Buildings
The 35-year plan to build a dense urban neighborhood, largely over what are now 88 acres of rail yards, will require about $2 billion in infrastructure investment, according to a plan summary. That spending on roads, bridges, parks, and transit would enable about $4.5 billion in private investment by developers of office towers, residential buildings, hotels, and other projects.

Anticipated is about 18 million square feet of new development, including enough housing to accommodate up to 10,000 residents. The commercial space includes about 1.2 million square feet planners hope will be occupied by a single corporate, commercial, or institutional tenant that will anchor the development, though none has yet been secured.

Project partners
As of September 2016 the following are partners of the project:
Amtrak
Brandywine Realty Trust
Drexel University
Pennsylvania Department of Transportation
SEPTA
City of Philadelphia
CSX Corporation
DVRPC
NJ Transit
Schuylkill Banks
University City District
University of Pennsylvania (Penn)

Awards

See also
Schuylkill Yards
List of tallest buildings in Philadelphia

References

External links
30th Street Station District Website
30th Street Station District - Drexel University

Proposed buildings and structures in Pennsylvania
Proposed skyscrapers in the United States
Urban development
Multi-building developments in Philadelphia